Muha is a surname. It may refer to:
Ada Vidovič Muha (born 1940), Slovene linguist
Asaf Ben-Muha (born 1985), Israeli association football player 
Joe Muha (1921–1993), American football player, coach and official
Joey Muha (born 1992), Canadian drummer

See also
 
 Mucha